Isabelle Rezazadeh, (born 28 March 1995) known by her stage name Rezz (stylized as REZZ), is a Canadian DJ and record producer from Niagara Falls, Ontario. She released her debut EP, Insurrection in 2015 through OWSLA's sub-label Nest HQ. In 2016, she signed with record label mau5trap, and released follow-ups The Silence is Deafening and Something Wrong Here. On August 4, 2017, Rezazadeh released her debut studio album, Mass Manipulation, with its follow up, Certain Kind of Magic, released in 2018.

Early life
Rezazadeh was born in Ukraine to a Ukrainian mother and an Iranian father, before moving to Canada at a young age. While attending high school, she worked at a Hard Rock Cafe at Niagara Falls.

Rezazadeh began DJing at the age of 16, playing music by other artists until she became inspired by a Deadmau5 concert to create her own. She was noticed on a blog by Skrillex, who then followed and sent her a message on Twitter.

Career

2013–2016: Early Career
In 2013, Rezazadeh started producing music on her laptop in her home in Niagara Falls, Ontario, and uploaded them to SoundCloud. She released Insurrection on Owsla subsidiary, NEST on July 20, 2015. Later that year, she released music on Deadmau5's record label, Mau5trap and her track "Serenity" was featured on the 2015 compilation album We Are Friends, Vol. 4.

In 2016, Rezazadeh announced her first EP on the music label Mau5trap, The Silence is Deafening, which released on January 22, 2016. This was followed by a second EP release on Mau5trap later that year, Something Wrong Here, on October 7, 2016. The EP charted in the United States, peaking at #19 on the Billboard Dance Charts.

2017–2018: Mass Manipulation and Certain Kind of Magic
In 2017, Mau5trap announced Rezazadeh's debut full length studio album, Mass Manipulation. On July 7, 2017, A music video for "Relax" was released on Mau5trap's YouTube channel to promote the album's release. A month later, Mass Manipulation was released on digital download stores on August 4, 2017, and on vinyl on October 6, 2017.

In 2018, Mass Manipulation was named the best Electronic Album of the Year at the Juno Awards.

On June 1, 2018, Rezazadeh announced her second studio album, Certain Kind of Magic. The album was released on August 3, 2018, through Mau5trap. Its lead single, "Witching Hour", was released on June 4, 2018. The album's second single, "Hex", was made in collaboration with 1788-L and released on June 29, 2018.

2019–present: Beyond the Senses & Spiral
On May 14, 2019, Rezz announced on Twitter that her EP Beyond the Senses was set for release on July 24. She released the single "Dark Age" the following day. On June 12, she released a collaboration with the American band Underoath titled "Falling". It was accompanied by a music video released the same day, as well as an online VR listening party through WaveVR, with VR Arcades across North America and also Otherworld in London taking part in physical events supporting the listening party.

She is profiled in the 2020 documentary film Underplayed, and will perform a DJ set following the film's Canadian premiere at the 2020 Toronto International Film Festival.

In 2021, Rezz and deadmau5 collaborated to release a single named "Hypnocurrency" on mau5trap. On April 24, she performed a set at Porter Robinson's virtual music festival, Secret Sky. On May 21, Rezz collaborated with Dove Cameron to make "Taste of You". Rezz released Spiral, her third album, on November 19.

In 2022, she launched a new label, HypnoVizion Records.

Discography

Studio albums

Extended plays

Singles

Remixes

Music videos

Awards and nominations

Juno Awards
{| class="wikitable sortable"
|-
! Year
! Association
! Category
! Nominee / Work
! Result
! class="unsortable" | 
|-
| 2018
| Juno Awards
| Electronic Album of the Year
| Mass Manipulation
| 
| 
|-
| 2019
| Juno Awards
| Electronic Album of the Year
| Certain Kind of Magic
| 
| 
|-
| 2020
| Juno Awards
| Electronic Album of the Year
| Beyond the Senses
| 
|

References

External links
 

1995 births
20th-century Canadian LGBT people
21st-century Canadian women musicians
21st-century Canadian LGBT people
Canadian DJs
Canadian electronic musicians
Canadian lesbian musicians
Canadian people of Iranian descent
Canadian women in electronic music
Canadian women record producers
Electronic dance music DJs
Juno Award for Electronic Album of the Year winners
LGBT DJs
Living people
Mau5trap artists
Musicians from the Regional Municipality of Niagara
Owsla artists
People from Niagara Falls, Ontario
Remixers
Ukrainian emigrants to Canada
Women DJs